Jay Isaac (born 1975) is a Canadian artist based in Rowley, New Brunswick, Canada. He is known primarily for his painting, but he has produced numerous projects within the social sphere. He was founder, editor, publisher, and designer of Hunter and Cook magazine (2009-2011).
He founded and ran the @nationalgalleryofcanada Instagram account (2014-2016). He founded and co-runs Peter Estey Fine Art, an auction house dedicated to presenting idiosyncratic historical Canadian art (2018–present). Isaac is represented by Paul Petro Contemporary Art in Toronto.

Early life and education
Isaac was born in Saint John, New Brunswick. He attended Cardiff School of Art and Design in Wales in 1996 and graduated from the Emily Carr Institute of Art and Design in 1997.

Career
In 2020 Isaac was awarded a Chalmers Fellowship through the Ontario Arts Council to research historic mural production in former Soviet Ukraine and Georgia and New Deal era murals from the United States. This research developed into a series of large scale paintings titled Mural Studies, which were exhibited at Paul Petro Contemporary Art, Toronto in 2021.

In 2018 the Toronto publisher Swimmers Group published "Like a Baby I Was Born Again", a book of Isaac’s drawings. The drawings were surreal, social and political commentary cartoons. Two of the drawings were exhibited at The Brucke Museum in Berlin.

His series "Second Eye", which was exhibited at Monte Clark Gallery, Toronto in 2012, was fabricated using a combination of unsold furniture items from a small antique shop he ran in Toronto and unresolved works in his studio. The amalgamation of the two “failed” components produced idiosyncratic sculptural works that writer Ben Portis described as “the nerviest gallery encounter of the year”.

Between 2005-2010 Isaac collaborated with musician Lorenz Peter to create Bay of Creatures, an experimental music project. A compilation was released by Toronto label Paper+Sound in 2017.

Selected exhibits

Group
 Season Gallery, Seattle, WA, 2020
 Brucke Museum, Berlin, 2019
 McIntosh Gallery, London ON, 2019
 Beaverbrook Art Gallery, 2014
 Contemporary Art Gallery (Vancouver), 2010
 Art Gallery of Ontario, 2009
 Agnes Etherington Art Centre, 2007
 Museum of Contemporary Canadian Art, 2006
 The Power Plant, 2004
 White Columns, 2004
 Bologna Gallery of Modern Art, 2002

Solo
 "Mural Studies", Paul Petro Contemporary Art, Toronto, 2021
 "Midnight Repairs", Paul Petro Contemporary Art, Toronto, 2019
 "High Gloss Ceilings", Cooper Cole, Toronto, 2017
 Monte Clark Gallery, 2012 and 2014
 Paul Petro Contemporary Art, 2010
 CUE art foundation, 2005
 Mercer Union, 2002

Collections
Agnes Etherington Art Centre, Kingston, Ontario
Glenbow Museum, Calgary, Alberta
Macdonald Stewart Art Centre, Guelph, Ontario
Osler, Hoskin & Harcourt, Toronto  
The Robert McLaughlin Gallery, Oshawa, Ontario
Tom Thomson Art Gallery, Owen Sound, Ontario
Winnipeg Art Gallery, Winnipeg Manotiba
Museum London, London, ON
Ivey School of Business, London, ON
Beaverbrook Art Gallery, Fredericton, NB

Selected publications
Off the Grid, Abstract Painting in New Brunswick, 2014, Beaverbrook Art Gallery
 Fantasy Art Now, 2014, ed. Jay Isaac & Sebastian Frye, Swimmer's Group, 
 60 Painters, 2012
 Triumphant Carrot: The Persistence of Still Life, 2010, Contemporary Art Gallery, Vancouver
 Hunter and Cook, 2008-2011, periodical, issues #01-10, Jay Isaac and Tony Romano
 Carte Blanche, Vol. 2: Painting, 2008, Magenta Foundation
 Jay Isaac, 2005, Cue Foundation, NY
 Officina America, 2002, Museum of Modern Art, Bologna, Italy
 Selling Out and Buying In, 2002, BizArt, Shanghai

Selected works

References

External links
 Jay Isaac Web
 Paul Petro Comptempary Art
 Peter Estey Fine Art
 Bay of Creatures

1975 births
Living people
Artists from Saint John, New Brunswick
Canadian contemporary painters
Canadian male painters
Canadian performance artists
21st-century Canadian painters
20th-century Canadian painters
20th-century Canadian male artists
21st-century Canadian male artists